Debonair Dancers is a 1986 short Canadian documentary film produced by Alison Nigh-Strelich. It was nominated for an Academy Award for Best Documentary Short.

References

External links

, posted by Alison Strelich

1986 films
1980s short documentary films
1986 short films
Canadian short documentary films
Canadian independent films
English-language Canadian films
Documentary films about dance
1986 independent films
1980s English-language films
1980s Canadian films